Jill Upson is a former Republican Delegate of the West Virginia House of Delegates, representing the 65th district, which includes Jefferson County, West Virginia. Upson was the first black Republican woman elected to the West Virginia House of Delegates.

Education 
Upson earned a Bachelor of Science degree in business administration from Shepherd University.

Career 
In 2012, Upson challenged incumbent Delegate Tiffany Lawrence and lost by four percent. In the 2014 election, Upson defeated Lawrence in a rematch. Upson won the 2014 election 56 to 44 percent. GOPAC, the national Republican political action committee, contributed over $20,000 to Upson's 2014 campaign.

In 2016, Upson won re-election over Democratic challenger Sammi Brown. In 2018, Upson was defeated by Brown.

Since leaving office, Upson has served as the executive director of the West Virginia Herbert Henderson Office of Minority Affairs.

Personal life
She is married to Kelvin Upson, who served in the United States Navy.  She has one son and had one daughter.

References

External links
 
 Jill Upson Facebook page

African-American state legislators in West Virginia
African-American women in politics
Year of birth missing (living people)
Republican Party members of the West Virginia House of Delegates
Women state legislators in West Virginia
Living people
People from Charles Town, West Virginia
21st-century American politicians
21st-century American women politicians
21st-century African-American women
21st-century African-American politicians
Shepherd University alumni